Oncidium leucochilum (or white-lipped oncidium) is an epiphytic species of orchid occurring from southeastern Mexico to Honduras.

References

External links
 Orchids.org: Oncidium leucochilum
 ECUAGENERA: Oncidium leucochilum

leucochilum
Orchids of Guatemala
Orchids of Mexico
Flora of Southeastern Mexico